The parish church of St. Gallus is a Roman Catholic church in the city of Bregenz in Vorarlberg, Austria.

The church is situated in the southeast of the city center in the district of Bregens village on a terrace, which slopes down to the creek valley.

External links 

 Website of the Parish of St. Gallus (in German)

Roman Catholic churches in Austria